James Inglis (1813–1872) was an American preacher and editor who was one of the earliest advocates of the dispensationalist form of premillennialism in the United States.

Inglis was born in Scotland and immigrated to the United States in 1848, settling in Michigan.  In Adrian, Michigan he was converted to the Baptist faith, and shortly after that became pastor of the First Baptist Church in Detroit, Michigan.  In 1854 he began to publish Waymarks in the Wilderness.  In this publication he admitted to drawing on the teaching of John Nelson Darby and the Plymouth Brethren in advocating the secret coming of Jesus Christ and the rapture.  This is called dispensationalism, but the name is misleading, because it is the secret coming and the removal for a time of the faithful, and not the view that there are different dispensations of the gospel, that distinguishes it from other forms of premillennialism.

Inglis would later move to Saint Louis, Missouri and eventually New York City and would continue to publish Waymarks in the Wilderness sporadically until his death.

Sources
 Pages 100-101

Bibliography
 The Bible Text Cyclopedia: A Complete Classification of Scripture Texts in the Form of an Alphabetical List of Subjects
 The Sabbath School and Bible Teaching
 Volume II, Nos. 1-6
 Volume V, No.4, and Volume VIII, No. 2

1813 births
Scottish emigrants to the United States
Baptists from New York (state)
1872 deaths
19th-century Christian theologians
19th-century American theologians
Baptists from Missouri
Baptists from Michigan
Converts to Baptist denominations
19th-century Baptist ministers from the United States
American editors
Clergy from New York City
Clergy from Detroit
People from Adrian, Michigan
Clergy from St. Louis
Editors of Christian publications